Aygünlü (also, Aygyunli, Gonchi, and Mollakamalli) is a village and municipality in the Shabran Rayon of Azerbaijan.  It has a population of 1,055.

References

Populated places in Shabran District